Patersonia rudis, commonly known as hairy flag, is a species of plant in the iris family Iridaceae and is endemic to the south-west of Western Australia. It is a tufted, rhizome-forming perennial herb with linear to sword-shaped leaves and violet tepals.

Description

Taxonomy and naming
Patersonia rudis was first described in 1846 by Stephan Endlicher in Lehmann's Plantae Preissianae. The specific epithet (rudis) means "rough" or "wild".

In 1986, David Alan Cooke and Alex George described two subspecies in the Flora of Australia and the names are accepted by the Australian Plant Census:
 Petersonia rudis subsp. velutina D.A.Cooke has shorter, narrower leaves than the autonym and the sheath is never glabrous.

Distribution and habitat
Subspecies rudis grows in woodland and forest on the Darling Range between New Norcia and Dwellingup in the Jarrah Forest and Swan Coastal Plain biogeographic regions of south-western Western Australia but subspecies velutina grows in more arid woodland and shrubland further east near Southern Cross and Coolgardie in the Avon Wheatbelt and Coolgardie bioregions.

Conservation status
Both subspecies of P. rudis are classified as "not threatened" by the Western Australian Government Department of Biodiversity, Conservation and Attractions.

References

rudis
Flora of Western Australia
Plants described in 1846
Taxa named by Stephan Endlicher